Rajko Štolfa Stadium is a multi-purpose stadium in Sežana, Slovenia. It is used mostly for football matches and is the home ground of the Slovenian PrvaLiga team NK Tabor Sežana. The stadium holds 1,310 spectators. It was known as Mestni stadion in the past. Since 2003, the stadium is named after Rajko Štolfa, a football administrator from Sežana.

See also
List of football stadiums in Slovenia

References

External links
Stadioni.org profile

Football venues in Slovenia
Multi-purpose stadiums in Slovenia
Sports venues completed in 1920
Sports venues in the Slovene Littoral
20th-century architecture in Slovenia